Kazimierz Jan Paweł Sapieha (1637–1720) was a Grand Hetman of Lithuania commencing in 1682. He held the title of a Duke starting in 1700. In 1681, he became Field Hetman of Lithuania, the following year he also became the voivode of Vilnius.

He commanded the Lithuanian Army contingent of the Polish–Lithuanian Commonwealth during the campaign to lift the Siege of Vienna by the Ottoman Turks.  When the main Polish Army under the King of Poland John III Sobieski, who was nominated the Supreme Commander of the Holy League, marched on Vienna and played a decisive role in the battle, it left Poland undefended. As a result, the Lithuanian troops were drawn into a fight along the Polish border tying down the anti-Habsburg Hungarian Kuruc forces under the vassal king of Upper Hungary, Imre Thököly, along the border between Upper Hungary and Poland.

This punitive action on the edge of the overall campaign was successful in keeping these irregular Hungarian troops (bolstered with Ottoman levies) from either raiding into Poland or coming to the assistance of the besieging Ottoman Army when the Holy League attacked their positions outside Vienna on 12 September 1683. He was meant to break off his attack along the Hungarian border and participate in the battle but by the time he arrived in Vienna at the head of the Lithuanian Army this famous Battle was concluded.

He was the founder of Sapieha Palace in Vilnius, which was designed by Pietro Perti from Italy.

References
KAZIMIERZ JAN PAWEŁ SAPIEHA iPSB

1637 births
1720 deaths
Jan Kazimierz the Younger
Field Hetmans of the Grand Duchy of Lithuania
Great Hetmans of the Grand Duchy of Lithuania
Voivode of Vilnius
Elders of Samogitia